Sabriye Şengül (born 12 November 1988) is a Turkish female professional boxer and world champion kickboxer. She competes also in mixed martial arts event.

Martial Arts Career 
Sabriye Şengül was born in Trabzon, northern Turkey on 12 November 1988. Her sports career began with playing handball. Upon her coach's advice, she switched over to boxing in 2006. She won three Turkish Boxing Championship titles.

In 2016, she became world champion in 57 kg kickboxing winning over Belgian Vanessa de Waelle by points at the WKU World Title Fight in Kickboxing with Knie held in Istanbul, Turkey. She won the world champion title for the second time defeating Austrian Christin Fedller at the ISKA Vendetta Professional World Kickboxing Championships in Vienna, Austria in 2018.

By April 2017, she signed for the flyweight division of the mixed martial arts event Bellator MMA. At her first fight for Bellator London 2 in November 2019, she lost to Dutch Denise Kielholtz by Americana submission in 32 seconds in the first round.

Şengül participated at Survivor Turkey's 2019 season.

By June 2021, she fought in a MMA game against French Mona Ftouhi in Dubai, UAE, and won by points decision.

Mixed martial arts record 

|-
|
|align=center| 
|Mena Mohamed Abdallah
|
|UAE Warriors 40
|
|align=center|
|align=center|
|Abu Dhabi, United Arab Emirates
| 
|-
|Loss
|align=center| 2–3
|Hassna Gaber
|Decision (unanimous)
|UAE Warriors 29
|
|align=center|3
|align=center|5:00
|Abu Dhabi, United Arab Emirates
| 
|-
|Loss
|align=center| 2–2
|Antonia Prifti
|TKO (head kick and punches)
|Vendetta 24
|
|align=center|2
|align=center|0:18
|Istanbul, Turkey
|
|-
|Win
|align=center| 2–1
|Martina Gemrani
|Submission
|Vendetta 21
|
|align=center|1
|align=center|3:10
|Istanbul, Turkey
| 
|-
|Win
|align=center| 1–1
|Mona Ftouhi
|Decision (unanimous)
|UAE Warriors 19
|
|align=center|3
|align=center|5:00
|Abu Dhabi, United Arab Emirates
|
|-
|Loss
|align=center| 0–1
|Denise Kielholtz
|Submission (americana)
|Bellator London 2
|
|align=center|1
|align=center|0:32
|London, England
|

References

External links
 Sabriye Sengul at Bellator (archived)
 

1988 births
Living people
Turkish women boxers
Turkish female kickboxers
Flyweight kickboxers
Turkish female mixed martial artists
Mixed martial artists utilizing boxing
Mixed martial artists utilizing kickboxing
Bellator female fighters
Survivor (franchise) contestants
Survivor Turkey contestants
Sportspeople from Trabzon